The Unger Steel Group is an  Austrian  company engaged in structural and architectural steel construction, including acting as a  general contractor. In addition to the  headquarters in Austria, it has around 20 subsidiaries in Central and Eastern Europe,  and the Middle East, with  an overall annual capacity of 70,000 tons for the two production facilities in Oberwart (Austria) and Sharjah (United Arab Emirates)

The family-owned company employs about 1,200 people.

Products 
 Architectural steel
 Hall constructions and industrial buildings
 Exhibition and event buildings
 Sports & leisure
 Shopping centres
 Car dealerships
 Airports
 Power plants
 Plant engineering
 Multi-storey car parks
 Office buildings
 Hotel and housebuildings
 Bridge building
 Social institutions

References

External links 
Official website

Construction and civil engineering companies of Austria
Construction and civil engineering companies established in 1952
Austrian companies established in 1952